Johny Joseph (born 29 May 1949) is an Indian Administrative Service officer of 1972 batch. He graduated from Trivandrum Engineering College with a degree in Mechanical Engineering and served as commissioner of  Brihanmumbai Municipal Corporation from 29 February 2004 to May 2007.

Work
Johny Joseph was the Maharashtra's Principal Secretary to the Chief Minister before the state government granted him the post of the civic chief of Mumbai. He was succeeded by Jairaj Phatak in May 2007. On 1 May 2007, he was appointed as Chief Secretary of Maharashtra.

Posts held in the Government
 Chief Secretary Government of Maharashtra  
 Municipal commissioner of Brihanmumbai Municipal Corporation
 Lokayukta

Personal life
Johny Joseph is married to  Reena Joseph who is an active environmentalist and patron of several social causes.

References

1949 births
Living people
Syro-Malabar Catholics
Indian Administrative Service officers
Mumbai civic officials